João Paulo Imbernom Sanches (born 14 August 1980), known as João Paulo Sanches, is a Brazilian football manager. He is the current technical coordinator of Atlético Goianiense.

Career
Sanches' first experience as first team manager occurred in February 2015, after Marcelo Chamusca's dismissal. He was in charge for two further spells during the year, replacing Jorginho and Gilberto Pereira.

Sanches returned to his assistant role in 2016, but was again appointed interim manager on 21 July 2017, replacing sacked Doriva. Despite failing to avoid relegation with the club, he was definitely named manager on 3 December.

Sanches went back to the assistant role after the appointment of Claudio Tencati, and subsequently had spells at Ponte Preta (as an assistant) and Aparecidense (as a manager) before returning to Dragão in 2020, as a technical coordinator. On 3 March 2021, after both manager Marcelo Cabo and permanent assistant manager Eduardo Souza left the club, he was named interim manager for the start of the campaign.

References

External links
Futebol de Goyaz profile 

1980 births
Living people
People from Mirassol
Brazilian football managers
Campeonato Brasileiro Série A managers
Atlético Clube Goianiense managers
Associação Atlética Aparecidense managers
Footballers from São Paulo (state)